Pat Cash and John Frawley defeated Rick Leach and John Ross in the final, 6–4, 6–7(5–7), 6–3 to win the inaugural Boys' Doubles tennis title at the 1982 Wimbledon Championships.

Seeds

  Rick Leach /  John Ross (final)
  Jonathan Canter /  Chuck Willenborg (semifinals)
  Pat Cash /  John Frawley (champions)
  Loïc Courteau /  Guy Forget (quarterfinals, withdrew)

Draw

Draw

References

External links

Boys' Doubles
Wimbledon Championship by year – Boys' doubles